The Suitor from the Highway (Swedish: Friaren från landsvägen) is a 1923 Swedish silent drama film directed by Sigurd Wallén and starring Edvin Adolphson, Jenny Hasselqvist and Gösta Alexandersson.

Cast
 Edvin Adolphson as 	Sten Selling
 Jenny Hasselqvist as 	Astrid Löwen
 Gösta Alexandersson as 	Gösta Lind
 Vilhelm Bryde as 	Binge
 Sigurd Wallén as 	Vagel
 John Ekman as Jonas Råsten

References

Bibliography
 Qvist, Per Olov & von Bagh, Peter. Guide to the Cinema of Sweden and Finland. Greenwood Publishing Group, 2000.

External links

1923 films
1923 drama films
Swedish drama films
Swedish silent feature films
Swedish black-and-white films
Films directed by Sigurd Wallén
1920s Swedish-language films
Silent drama films
1920s Swedish films